This Is the Sea is a 1997 Irish film directed and written by Mary McGuckian and produced by Michael Garland.  It is a romance film, focusing on the relationship between the character Hazel Stokes, played by Samantha Morton, and Malachy McAliskey, played by Ross McDade.

Plot
The two lovers live in Northern Ireland.  Stokes is a Protestant, and McAliskey is Catholic. Their relationship is complicated by the spying of Stokes' brother Jef, played by Marc O'Shea, and by the attempts of Rohan, played by Gabriel Byrne, to recruit McAliskey into the Republican movement. The film also stars Richard Harris as Old Man Jacobs, an ally to the couple.

Title
The film's title comes from the song "This Is the Sea" from the 1985 music album This Is the Sea by the folk-rock band The Waterboys.

Soundtrack
The film's soundtrack uses seven different Waterboys songs.  Mike Scott, The Waterboys' lead singer, shares music credits for the film with singer Brian Kennedy.

References

External links
 
 
 
 TLA Video & DVD Guide 2004 review

1997 films
English-language Irish films
Northern Irish films
Films set in Northern Ireland
1997 romantic drama films
The Waterboys
1990s English-language films